Apayao's at-large congressional district refers to the lone congressional district of the Philippines in the province of Apayao. It has been represented in the House of Representatives of the Philippines since 1998. It was previously included in Kalinga-Apayao's at-large congressional district from 1969 to 1998. The district is currently represented in the 19th Congress by Eleonor Bulut Begtang of the Nationalist People's Coalition (NPC).

Representation history

Election results

2022

2019

2016

2013

References 

Congressional districts of the Philippines
1995 establishments in the Philippines
At-large congressional districts of the Philippines
Congressional districts of the Cordillera Administrative Region
Constituencies established in 1995